Thomas Bonia (1856 – September 25, 1926) was a mariner and politician in Newfoundland. He represented Placentia and St. Mary's in the Newfoundland House of Assembly from 1900 to 1908.

He was born in Placentia and first became involved in the Newfoundland seal-hunt as a youth. By 1876, he was master of his own vessel and was involved in the cod fishery in the Strait of Belle Isle and the Grand Banks from 1880 to 1884. In 1894, he became commander of the ship providing mail and passenger service for Placentia Bay. He was elected to the Newfoundland assembly in 1900, reelected in 1904 and retired from politics in 1908. From 1909 to 1923, Bonia served as Inspector of Outport Roads. In April 1923, he was named to the cabinet as Minister of Finance and Customs but did not win election in the general election held in June of that year. Bonia was then appointed to the Legislative Council of Newfoundland and was named Minister of Posts and Telegraphs. He resigned with the rest of the cabinet in July 1923.

References 

Members of the Newfoundland and Labrador House of Assembly
Members of the Legislative Council of Newfoundland
Members of the Executive Council of Newfoundland and Labrador
1856 births
1926 deaths
Newfoundland Colony people
Government ministers of the Dominion of Newfoundland
People from Placentia, Newfoundland and Labrador